Milica Pejanović-Đurišić (Cyrillic: Милица Пејановић-Ђуришић; born 27 April 1959) is a Montenegrin professor and politician who was Minister of Defense from 2012 to 2016. She is the first woman to hold this office. She is currently active as Ambassador of Montenegro to the United Nations.

Political career

Anti-bureaucratic revolution and the DPS foundation
Pejanović-Đurišić was active in the League of Communists of Yugoslavia, where Momir Bulatović chose her as a board member on the organizational committee which replaced the older communists during the anti-bureaucratic revolution in Montenegro in January 1989. When Yugoslavia began to break up, she supported Montenegro remaining in Yugoslavia in 1992.

Split in the Democratic Party of Socialists
In 1997, when the Democratic Party of Socialists began to split between Đukanović and Bulatović, she initially was closer to Bulatović. However, she abruptly cut herself off from Bulatović after one of the DPS committee meetings, after which she was chosen to be the new president by the DPS. In addition to consolidating power with Đukanović, her split from Bulatović resulted in an explosive feud, as Bulatović called her "Mata Hari in a nightgown", and accused her of "selling her soul" for "shares in Crnogorski Telekom". Pejanović-Đurišić responded to the accusations with a statement saying that "Bulatović is a given contradiction, he's Robin Hood and Pol Pot, Šćepan Mali and Vojislav Šešelj, and in fact their miserable surrogate...his political end will be sad."

Crnogorski Telekom
Pejanović-Đurišić became the president of the board of Crnogorski Telekom while retaining her position in DPS. Opposition parties accused her of using an illegal loophole for privatizing Telekom, although a court case ruled that she did not break the law. She participated in the formulation of the 2001 tender for Telekom, the state's first attempt of privatizing the telecommunications operator.

She advocated for a "phased" privatization of Telekom, arguing that a privatization in phases would guarantee the state would have a certain amount of company shares "in any variant".

Ambassador of Serbia and Montenegro
From February 2004 to July 2006, she served as the Ambassador of Serbia and Montenegro to Belgium and Luxembourg. After Montenegro's independence in 2006, she served as Montenegro's ambassador to France, Monaco (Pejanović-Đurišić being fluent in French) and UNESCO from February 2007 to 2010.

Minister of Defence of Montenegro
In 2012, Pejanovic-Djurisic was appointed as Minister of Defence in the Milo Đukanović's VI Cabinet of Montenegro, as a member and vice-president of the Đukanović's DPS. She was first female office holder of Minister of Defence of Montenegro, and only till today. She was in office until October 2016, when she was replaced by Predrag Boskovic, also an DPS member.

References

Bibliography

External links 

Article in Serbian at Danas.rs
Montenegrin Ministry of Defence
Report in Blic

Living people
1959 births
Defence ministers of Montenegro
Female defence ministers
Politicians from Nikšić
Montenegrin women in politics
Ambassadors of Montenegro to France
Democratic Party of Socialists of Montenegro politicians
Diplomats from Nikšić
Permanent Representatives of Montenegro to the United Nations
Women government ministers of Montenegro